John Pier "Jack" Roemer, Jr., (August 9, 1953June 3, 2022) was an American lawyer and judge in the U.S. state of Wisconsin.  He served 13 years as Wisconsin circuit court judge for Juneau County.  He was murdered five years after retiring from the court.

Biography
John Pier Roemer, Jr., was born in Milwaukee, Wisconsin, in August 1953.  He attended Hamline University School of Law, in St. Paul, Minnesota, and graduated in 1983.  He worked as an attorney in private practice for several years, and also worked as a public defender in Baraboo, Wisconsin.  He was commissioned as an officer in the United States Army Reserve around this time and served in the Reserves until retiring as a lieutenant colonel in 2002.

In 1992, he was hired as an assistant district attorney in Juneau County, Wisconsin, under district attorney Dennis Schuh.  He and Schuh worked together until the death of Juneau County Wisconsin circuit court judge John W. Brady in 2003.  After Brady's death, Governor Jim Doyle appointed Schuh to the vacant judgeship.  With Schuh's elevation, Roemer became acting district attorney, but soon announced his own candidacy for the judgeship, challenging Schuh in the Spring 2004 election.

Roemer prevailed in the election, receiving 62% of the vote.  He took office in August 2004 and was re-elected without opposition in 2010 and 2016.  He retired shortly after the start of his third term, in August 2017, to spend more time with his ailing wife.

Assassination

On June 3, 2022, Roemer was shot and killed in his home by Douglas K. Uhde.  Uhde had appeared in Roemer's court in 2005 and was convicted and sentenced to six years in prison for armed burglary with a dangerous weapon.  After killing Roemer, Uhde shot himself, but was still alive when discovered by police.  Uhde died at a nearby hospital four days later.

Uhde was described by police as a likely "grievance collector" and had a list of other targets which included Democratic Wisconsin governor Tony Evers, Democratic Michigan governor Gretchen Whitmer, and Republican U.S. Senate leader Mitch McConnell.

Personal life and family
John Roemer married Vivian Mae Schroeder on November 20, 1980.  They had three sons.  His wife died in 2018.  Roemer was active in the St. Paul's Evangelical Lutheran Church in Mauston, Wisconsin.

Electoral history

Wisconsin Circuit Court (2004)

| colspan="6" style="text-align:center;background-color: #e9e9e9;"| General Election, April 6, 2004

See also
 List of homicides in Wisconsin

References

1953 births
2022 deaths
Hamline University School of Law alumni
United States Army reservists
Lawyers from Milwaukee
Military personnel from Milwaukee
People from New Lisbon, Wisconsin
District attorneys in Wisconsin
Wisconsin state court judges
Assassinated American judges